Henrik Rung  (March 30, 1807 - December 12, 1871) was a Danish composer.

Early life and education
Henrik Rung was born in Copenhagen.
Rung received training with the Royal Danish Orchestra  in Copenhagen. 
He received a travel grant to study in Germany, Italy  and Paris (1837-1840).

Career
In 1842, Rung became a singing master and held a lifelong position as a director of the opera at the Royal Danish Theatre.

Personal life
In 1841 he married the opera singer Pauline Lichtenstein. His son Frederik Rung (1854-1914) was also a composer and his daughter Sophie Keller (1850–1929) was an opera singer at the Royal Danish Theatre.

Compositions

Songs
 I Danmark er jeg født (1850)

Recordings
 Songs on Roses and Love. Helene Wold (Soprano), Per Andreas Tonder (Baritone), Eugene Asti (Piano), Vegard Lund (Guitar) Lawo 2011
 Waltz Serenade. Mair-Davis Duo, Marilyn Mair, mandolin; Mark Davis, guitar: "Vienna Nocturne" North Star Records, 1991

References

This article was initially translated from the Danish Wikipedia.

Link
Henrik Rung - A Danish Counterpart to Fernando Sor, by Jens Bang-Rasmussen

Male composers
1807 births
1871 deaths
19th-century Danish composers
Burials at Holmen Cemetery
19th-century male musicians